Galhyeon-dong is a dong, neighbourhood of Eunpyeong-gu in Seoul, South Korea.

See also 
Administrative divisions of South Korea

References

External links
Eunpyeong-gu official website
 Eunpyeong-gu map at the Eunpyeong-gu official website
 Galhyeon 1-dong resident office website

Neighbourhoods of Eunpyeong District